Staraya Bura (İśke Bura) is a rural locality (a village) in Novoburinsky Selsoviet, Krasnokamsky District, Bashkortostan, Russia. The population was 251 as of 2010. There are 3 streets.

Geography 
Staraya Bura is located 58 km southeast of Nikolo-Beryozovka (the district's administrative centre) by road. Novaya Bura is the nearest rural locality.

References 

Rural localities in Krasnokamsky District